is the 17th major single by the Japanese idol group Cute, released in Japan on September 7, 2011 on the Zetima label.

Background 
The single will be released in three versions: Regular Edition (catalog number EPCE-5816), and Limited Editions A (EPCE-5812/3) and B (EPCE-5814/5) that include a bonus DVD. Limited Edition A DVD will contain the "Sekaiichi Happy na Onna no Ko (Dance Shot Ver.)" music video, and Limited Edition B will have "Sekaiichi Happy na Onna no Ko (Color Box Ver.)".

The Single V will be released on September 14.

CD single

Track listing

Bonus 
Sealed into all the limited editions
 Event ticket lottery card with a serial number

Single V

Event V

Charts

Sales and certifications

References

External links 
 Thunku's comments on the single
  - Hello! Project
  - Up-Front Works
 
 
 

2011 singles
Japanese-language songs
Cute (Japanese idol group) songs
Songs written by Tsunku
Song recordings produced by Tsunku
Zetima Records singles
2011 songs